Nora Gordon (29 November 1893, West Hartlepool, County Durham – 11 May 1970, London) was a British film and television actress. She was married to Leonard Sharp. Her daughter was the actress Dorothy Gordon.

Selected filmography

 Facing the Music (1941)
 Danny Boy (1941) - Mrs. Maloney
 Old Mother Riley's Circus (1941) - 1st Charwoman
 Sheepdog of the Hills (1941) - Mrs. Weeks, Varney's housekeeper (uncredited)
 Somewhere in Camp (1942) - Matron (uncredited)
 Front Line Kids (1942) - Evacuee organiser
 Green Fingers (1947) - Mrs. Green (uncredited)
 Death in High Heels (1947) - Miss Arris
 The Mark of Cain (1947) - Guard (uncredited)
 Journey Ahead (1947) - Mrs. Deacon
 My Brother Jonathan (1948) - Mrs. Stevens
 The Fallen Idol (1948) - Waitress (uncredited)
 Floodtide (1949) - Mrs. Dow (uncredited)
 Once a Sinner (1950) - Mrs. Barker (uncredited)
 The Woman in Question (1950) - Neighbour (uncredited)
 Blackmailed (1951) - Sine's Housekeeper
 Circle of Danger (1951) - Sheila (uncredited)
 Night Was Our Friend (1951) - Kate
 The Woman's Angle (1952) - (Guest House Owner) - (uncredited)
 Sing Along with Me (1952) 
 Murder at 3am (1953) - Nanna
 Twice Upon a Time (1953) - Emma
 Murder by Proxy (1954) - Casey's Mother 
 Radio Cab Murder (1954) - Fred's landlady (uncredited)
 The Glass Cage (1955) - Marie Sapolio
 The Constant Husband (1955) - Housekeeper (uncredited)
 Police Dog (1955) - Mrs. Lewis  
 A Kid for Two Farthings (1955) - Customer (uncredited)
 Woman in a Dressing Gown (1957) - Mrs. Williams
 Sapphire (1959) - Newsagent's Wife (uncredited)
 Horrors of the Black Museum (1959) - Woman in Hall
 High Jump (1959) - Mrs. Barlow
 Top Floor Girl (1959) - (uncredited)
 The Grass Is Greener (1960) - Housekeeper (uncredited)
 Sentenced for Life (1960) - (uncredited)
 Ticket to Paradise (1961) - Mrs. Withers
 Victim (1961) - Farr's housekeeper (uncredited)
 Konga (1961) - Lady at Party (uncredited)
 Four Winds Island (1961) - Mrs. Bennett 
 Twice Round the Daffodils (1962) - Cleaner
 The Piper's Tune (1962) - Theresa
 Heavens Above! (1963) - Old lady in garden (uncredited)
 Carry On Spying (1964) - Elderly Woman (uncredited)
 The Curse of the Mummy's Tomb (1964) - Sir Giles's Housekeeper (uncredited)
 The Nanny (1965) - Mrs. Griggs

References

External links

1893 births
1970 deaths
English film actresses
People from West Hartlepool
Actors from County Durham
20th-century English actresses